Arne Kielland (8 September 1939 – 6 July 2003) was a Norwegian journalist and politician for the Norwegian Labour Party and later the Socialist Left Party (SV). He was a member of the Parliament of Norway from 1969 to 1973, representing Sør-Trøndelag, and from 1973 to 1977, representing Telemark.

References

1939 births
2003 deaths
Politicians from Skien
Members of the Storting
Labour Party (Norway) politicians
Socialist Left Party (Norway) politicians
Politicians from Telemark
Sør-Trøndelag politicians
20th-century Norwegian politicians